Alexi Batista sometimes written as Alexis Batista (born ) is a Panamanian male weightlifter. He represented Panama at international competitions. He participated at the 1996 Summer Olympics in the 64 kg event and at the 2000 Summer Olympics in the 69 kg event. He competed at world championships, most recently at the 1999 World Weightlifting Championships.

Major results

References

External links
 

1976 births
Living people
Panamanian male weightlifters
Weightlifters at the 2000 Summer Olympics
Olympic weightlifters of Panama
Place of birth missing (living people)
Weightlifters at the 1996 Summer Olympics
Weightlifters at the 1999 Pan American Games
Pan American Games medalists in weightlifting
Pan American Games bronze medalists for Panama